"Ashes to Ashes" is a song written by Dennis Lambert and Brian Potter and performed by The 5th Dimension.  It reached #7 on both the Canadian adult contemporary and the U.S. adult contemporary charts, #50 on the Canadian pop chart, #52 on the Billboard Hot 100, and #54 on the U.S. R&B chart in 1973.  It was featured on their 1973 album, Living Together, Growing Together.

The song was produced by Bones Howe and arranged by Rene DeKnight.

Other versions
Lambert released the original version of the song as the B-side to his 1972 single, "Dream On".

References

1973 songs
1973 singles
Songs written by Dennis Lambert
Songs written by Brian Potter (musician)
The 5th Dimension songs
Song recordings produced by Bones Howe
Bell Records singles